Spartak Moscow won their sixth consecutive Russian title, and ninth overall.

However, the season was overshadowed by the death of CSKA and Ukraine goalkeeper Serhiy Perkhun, when he clashed heads with Anzhi striker Budun Budunov during the round 22 match against them  on 18 August. Both players were injured, and Perkhun died from a brain haemorrhage caused by the collision on 28 August in the age of 23, 10 days after the match against Anzhi.

Overview

Standings

Results

Season statistics

Top goalscorers

Awards 
On 20 November, Russian Football Union named its list of 33 top players:

Goalkeepers
  Ruslan Nigmatullin (Lokomotiv Moscow)
  Serhiy Perkhun (CSKA Moscow)
  Maxym Levitsky (Spartak Moscow)

Right backs
  Gennadiy Nizhegorodov (Lokomotiv Moscow)
  Dmitri Sennikov (Lokomotiv Moscow)
  Vladimir Kurayev (Saturn)

Centre backs
  Igor Chugainov (Lokomotiv Moscow)
  Igor Mitreski (Spartak Moscow)
  Yevgeni Bushmanov (Krylia Sovetov)

Left backs
  Yuri Kovtun (Spartak Moscow)
  Jacob Lekgetho (Lokomotiv Moscow)
  Valeri Tsvetkov (Zenit)

Stoppers
  Sergei Ignashevich (Lokomotiv Moscow)
  Aleksei Katulsky (Zenit)
  Dmytro Parfenov (Spartak Moscow)

Defensive midfielders
  Marat Izmailov (Lokomotiv Moscow)
  Dmitri Loskov (Lokomotiv Moscow)
  Olexandr Gorshkov (Zenit)

Right wingers
  Rolan Gusev (Dynamo Moscow)
  Andrei Arshavin (Zenit)
  Andrei Konovalov (Krylia Sovetov)

Central midfielders
  Yegor Titov (Spartak Moscow)
  Valery Yesipov (Rotor)
  Andrey Tikhonov (Krylia Sovetov)

Left wingers
  Andrei Karyaka (Krylia Sovetov)
  Olexandr Spivak (Zenit)
  Ruslan Agalarov (Anzhi)

Right forwards
  Vladimir Beschastnykh (Spartak Moscow)
  Dmitri Vyazmikin (Torpedo Moscow)
  James Obiorah (Lokomotiv Moscow)

Left forwards
  Sergei Semak (CSKA Moscow)
  Ruslan Pimenov (Lokomotiv Moscow)
  Aleksandr Kerzhakov (Zenit)

Medal squads

See also 
 2001 in Russian football

References

External links 
 RSSSF

2001
1
Russia
Russia